Tikti Mach'ay (Quechua tikti wart, mach'ay cave, "wart cave", Hispanicized spelling Tictimachay) is a mountain in the Andes of Peru, about  high. It is situated in the Lima Region, Huarochiri Province, Chicla District. Tikti Mach'ay is near the Antikuna mountain pass, southeast of the peak of Yuraqqucha, northeast of Jirish Mach'ay and west of Waqraqucha. Tiktiqucha lies at its feet.

References

Mountains of Peru
Mountains of Lima Region